ICC International Court of Arbitration is an institution for the resolution of international commercial disputes. It operates under the auspices of the International Chamber of Commerce and consists of more than 100 arbitrators from roughly 90 countries. 

The ICC does not issue formal judgements. Instead, it provides "judicial supervision of arbitration proceedings".

The court's official working languages are English and French. Cases can be administered in any language. It is headquartered in Paris, France.

As of 9 January 2020, the court has registered 25,000 cases, including an annual record of 869 in 2019.

Background
The Court was founded in 1923 under the leadership of the ICC's first president Étienne Clémentel, a former French Minister of Finance.

Members of the ICC Court are appointed to three-year terms by the ICC World Council on the recommendation of ICC 'national committees' or groups. In jurisdictions where there is no national committee or group, members are recommended for appointment by the President of the Court. Alternate members are appointed by the World Council on the recommendation of the court's President.

The President of the ICC Court is Claudia Salomon of the US.

References

External links
 International Court of Arbitration website
 International Chamber of Commerce website

International arbitration courts and tribunals
International organizations based in France
Organizations based in Paris
Arbitration organizations
1923 establishments in France